Santiváñez Municipality is the second municipal section of the Capinota Province in the Cochabamba Department, Bolivia. Its seat is Santiváñez.

Subdivision 
Santiváñez Municipality is divided into seven cantons.

See also 
 Waña Quta

References 

Municipalities of the Cochabamba Department